Colby John Parkinson (born January 8, 1999) is an American football tight end for the Seattle Seahawks of the National Football League (NFL). He played college football at Stanford.

Early years
Parkinson attended Oaks Christian School in Westlake Village, California, where he played varsity football and basketball. In 2015, his junior football season, he caught 24 passes for 289 yards and four touchdowns. In December of the same year he committed to play college football at Stanford University. During his senior year he played in the U.S. Army All-American Bowl.

College career
In 2017, Parkinson's freshman year at Stanford, he appeared in all 14 of Stanford's games, catching ten passes for 97 yards and four touchdowns.

As a sophomore in 2018, Parkinson played in 13 games (nine starts), catching 29 passes for 485 yards and seven touchdowns. On November 10, in a game versus Oregon State, Parkinson had six catches for 166 yards and four touchdowns, tying the Stanford record for most touchdowns in a single game for a tight end. He earned All-Pac-12 Conference honorable mention.

After his 2019 junior season where he had 48 catches for 589 yards and one touchdown, Parkinson announced that he would forgo his senior season and enter the 2020 NFL Draft.

Professional career 

In the 2020 NFL Draft, Parkinson was selected in the fourth round with the 133rd overall pick by the Seattle Seahawks. He was placed on the active/non-football injury list at the start of training camp on August 3, 2020. He was moved to the reserve/non-football injury list at the start of the regular season on September 5, 2020. He was activated on October 31.

On September 7, 2021, Parkinson was placed on injured reserve with a broken foot. He returned to the roster on October 2, 2021.

References

External links
Seattle Seahawks bio
Stanford Cardinal bio

1999 births
Living people
American football tight ends
People from Simi Valley, California
Players of American football from California
Sportspeople from Ventura County, California
Stanford Cardinal football players
Seattle Seahawks players